The Italy women's national under-20 volleyball team represents Italy in international women's volleyball competitions and friendly matches under the age 20 and it is ruled by the Italian Volleyball Federation That is an affiliate of International Volleyball Federation FIVB and also a part of European Volleyball Confederation CEV.

Results

FIVB U20 World Championship
 Champions   Runners-up   Third place   Fourth place

Europe U19 Championship
 Champions   Runners-up   Third place   Fourth place

Team

Current squad
The following is the Italian roster in the 2019 FIVB Volleyball Women's U20 World Championship.

Head coach: Massimo Bellano

References

External links
  Official website 

National women's under-20 volleyball teams
Volleyball
Volleyball in Italy
Women's volleyball in Italy